Perdrix River may refer to:

 Perdrix River (Bécancour River tributary), Quebec, Canada
 Perdrix River (Eeyou Istchee Baie-James), a tributary of the Wawagosic River in Quebec, Canada
 Rivière des Perdrix (Bras Saint-Nicolas), Montmagny Regional County Municipality, Chaudière-Appalaches, Quebec, Canada

See also
 Perdrix (disambiguation)